Qapaghan or Qapghan Qaghan (meaning "the conqueror", Xiao'erjing: ٿِيًا شًا, Dungan: Чяншан, also called Bögü Qaghan in Bain Tsokto inscriptions) was the second khagan of the Second Turkic Khaganate during Wu Zetian's reign and was the younger brother of the first kaghan, Ilterish Qaghan.

Name 
His personal name Mochuo is Chinese transcription of his Turkic name Bögü-Çor, with  meaning "wise". The same name occurs in the Sogdian version of the Karabalsagun inscription (821 AD). He used the name Bögü Chor Shad during Ilterish's reign. His regnal name Qapaghan comes from the Old Turkic verb "kap-" meaning "to conquer".

Early years 
He was born around 664. In 681, he assisted his brother, Ilterish Qaghan, in a revolt against Tang dominion, and succeeded in reviving the Eastern Turkic Khaganate.

In 689, he led a raid to frontier areas. In reaction, Empress Wu sent Huaiyi to fortify. He advanced to Zi River (紫河, a tributary of the Yellow River) but did not encounter Tujue forces. He erected a monument at Chanyu Tower (單于臺, in modern Hohhot, Inner Mongolia) before withdrawing.

Reign 
In 692, he succeeded his brother as khagan. His succession was seen as usurpation in China.

In 694, Qapaghan attacked Ling Prefecture (roughly modern Yinchuan, Ningxia), and Wu Zetian commissioned Huaiyi, assisted by the chancellors Li Zhaode and Su Weidao, to defend against Qapaghan attack, but before the army could set out, Qapaghan withdrew, and therefore Huaiyi's army never launched.

In summer 696, The Khitan chieftains Li Jinzhong and Sun Wanrong, brothers-in-law, angry over the mistreatment of the Khitan people by the Zhou official Zhao Wenhui (趙文翽), the prefect of Ying Prefecture (roughly Zhaoyang County, Liaoning), rebelled, with Li assuming the title of Wushang Khan. Armies that Wu Zetian sent to suppress Li and Sun's rebellion were defeated by Khitan forces, which in turn attacked Zhou proper. Khagan encouraged the Khitan's Li-Sun Rebellion (696–697) to eventually attack and plunder successful Khitan on their rear, to his full benefit.

Meanwhile, Qapaghan Qaghan offered help and yet was also launching attacks against Zhou and Khitan—including an attack against Khitan base of operations during the winter of 696, shortly after Li's death, that captured Li's and Sun's families and temporarily halted Khitan operations against Zhou. Sun, after taking over as khan and reorganizing Khitan forces, again attacked Zhou territory and had many victories over Zhou forces, including a battle during which Wang Shijie was killed. Wu Zetian tried to allay the situation by making peace with khagan at fairly costly terms—the return of Turkic people who had previously submitted to Zhou and providing Turks with seeds, silk, tools, and iron. In summer 697, Qapaghan launched another attack on Khitan's base of operations, and this time, after his attack, Khitan forces collapsed and Sun was killed in flight, ending the Khitan threat. Empress Wu gave him the title Ilterish Da Chanyu (頡跌利施大單于), Ligong Baoguo (立功報國), Generalissimo of the Left Guards (左衛大將軍) as well as Duke of Guiguo (歸國)  and Qianshan Khagan (迁善可汗), literally meaning "Good moving khagan" in 695.

After securing Chinese border, in winter, he turned his attention to further expansion to north, notably subjugating Yenisei Kyrgyz and killing their khagan. While preparing an attack on Turgesh forces, his khatun died, so invasion had to be called off.

In 698, Qapaghan demanded a Tang dynasty prince for marriage to his daughter, part of a plot to join his family with the Tang, displace the Zhou, and restore Tang rule over China under his influence. When Wu Zetian sent a member of her own family, grandnephew Wu Yanxiu (武延秀), to marry Qapaghan's daughter instead. Zhang Jianzhi opposed, stating, "In ancient times, no Chinese imperial prince had ever married a barbarian woman as his wife." This opposition drew displeasure from Wu Zetian, as she wanted peace with Turks, and she demoted Zhang to be the prefect of He Prefecture (合州, modern northern Chongqing). Khagan nevertheless rejected the prince. He had no intention to cement the peace treaty with a marriage; instead, when Wu Yanxiu arrived, he detained Wu Yanxiu and then launched a major attack on Zhou, advancing as far south as Zhao Prefecture (趙州, in modern Shijiazhuang, Hebei). He created Chinese general Yan Zhiwei (阎知微) as Southern Khagan (南面可汗) persuaded Yan to help invade cities of Zhaozhou and Dingzhou. Zhou general Murong Xuanjiao (慕容玄皦) also submitted to Qapaghan with 5000 soldiers.

In August 698, Qapaghan attacked Dingzhou, captured and killed its governor Sun Yangao (孙彦高), burning the city alongside. Wu Zetian angered to the point that she issued a proclamation that if anyone killed the khagan would be granted title Prince. She subsequently renamed him Zhanchuo (斩啜, meaning "chopped head") as a play on his name Mochuo.

In September, Zhaozhou was also attacked, deputy governor Tang Boruo (唐波若) handed over the keys and governor Gao Rui (高睿) was immediately executed.

In October, khagan let Yan Zhiwei (阎知微) to go back to China, who was captured and executed on charges of treason.

Reforms 
In 699, he appointed his younger brother Ashina Duoxifu as Tölös shad, meaning governor eastern wing, his nephew Ashina Mojilian as governor of western wing with each of them commanding 20000 men, also putting his son Bögü as their overseer, creating him as lesser khagan. He was also given command of Onoq with 40000 men.

Later reign 
In 703, he sent Tonyukuk for another marriage proposal. Wu Zetian accepted the proposal; in exchange, Wu Yanxiu was released on khagan's order. However, Emperor Zhongzhong's accession changed political climate.

In 705, Tujue forces commanded by Mojilian entered Lingwu, defeating Shazha Chongyi (沙吒忠义), he was dismissed from service. Angered Zhongzhong declined marriage proposal and proclaimed prize for anyone willing to kill khagan.

In 711, khagan sent a marriage proposal to Ruizong, this time intending to marry a Tang Princess. Emperor Ruizong accepted and created a daughter of Li Chengqi, the Princess Jinshan (金山公主). Excited khagan sent his son Ashina Yangwozhi (阿史那楊我支) to Changan. However, the decision was soon reversed by newly enthroned Xuanzong.

Later that year Turgesh forces were crushed by Tonyukuk in Battle of Bolchu. Certain Bars Beg (or probably Suluk) was appointed chief of Turgesh and married Mojilian's daughter. In 713, Karluks were defeated by combined forces of Kapaghan, Mojilian and Kul Tegin.

In 714, February Inel, Tonga Tegin and khagan's brother-in-law Huoba Elteber Ashibi attacked Beiting, during the siege Tonga Tegin was killed, while Ashibi fled to Tang in fear, where who would be renamed Huoba Guiren (火拔歸仁) and created a general.

In 715, due to his cruelty, some his men and a number of tribes, including his Korean son-in-law Gao Wenjian (高文簡) and Ashide son-in-law Ashide Hulu (阿史德胡禄) submitted to Tang. Rebellions of tribes followed later.

Death 
Khagan was on his way back from suppressing the revolting Tiele tribes of Huihe, Tongluo, Baixi, Bayegu and Pugu, was ambushed killed by a Bayegu tribesman named Xiezhilue (颉质略) on July 22, 716 while passing through a forest. His severed head was sent to Changan.

Family 
According to Cuisenier, he married El Bilga Khatun, a widow of his brother. He had a number of issues:

 Inel Khagan
 Tonga Tegin (d. 713, Beiting)
 Mo Tegin (Left Wise Prince)
 Bilge Tegin (Right Wise Prince)
 Ashina Yangwozhi (阿史那楊我支) (d. 715)
 Kuchluk Bilge Khatun (698-723) was married to Ashide Hulu (阿史德胡禄)
 Unnamed daughter was married to Gao Wenjian (高文簡)

In popular culture
 Portrayed by Kang Jae-ik in the 2006-2007 KBS TV series Dae Jo Yeong.

See also 
 Kavhan

References 

716 deaths
Göktürk khagans
7th-century births
Ashina house of the Turkic Empire
8th-century Turkic people
Tengrist monarchs
8th-century murdered monarchs
Monarchs killed in action